Bob Donewald, Sr. (Born May 29, 1942) is a retired American college basketball coach.  He was the first coach to lead Illinois State University to the NCAA post-season national tournament, and he did so for three consecutive seasons. His 1983 team gave Illinois State its first Missouri Valley Conference basketball championship and his 1984 team captured Illinois State's first Division I NCAA Tournament victory.  He coached at South Bend St. Joseph's High School for 8 seasons, from 1965–66 to 1972–73.

Donewald was an assistant coach under Indiana University coach Bobby Knight, for three seasons (1974–75 to 1977–78) and was a member of the Hoosiers staff in 1976 when Indiana went undefeated and won the national title.  In 1978, Donewald was hired as the new head coach of the Illinois State Redbirds, replacing Gene Smithson.  In Donewald's second season, the Redbirds qualified for the NIT's post-season tournament, and then, in 1983, the Redbirds entered March Madness for the first time in their history by winning the Missouri Valley Conference post-season tournament. 

Donewald's Redbirds also qualified for the NCAA tournament the next two seasons.  Donewald's success was parlayed into a student referendum to build a new arena to replace Horton Field House, in use from 1963–1988.  Redbird Arena was approved, and was built mostly from student fees collected over the next twenty years.  Donewald began to acquire a national reputation, and in 1982 turned down an opportunity to coach the Wisconsin Badgers.

However, Donewald's ISU teams relied upon a slow moving game, similar to a four corners offense.  With the introduction of the shot clock in the mid-1980s, Donewald's strategies and his teams began to suffer.  In 1989, after failing to replicate his earlier successes, Donewald was fired by ISU.  He was immediately hired as coach of the Western Michigan University Broncos, where he coached until 2000.  In the 1997–98 season—his 9th season as head coach at WMU—the Broncos qualified for the NCAA tournament, where they advanced to the second round before being eliminated.  In 1992, Donewald was named Coach of the Year for the Mid-American Conference.  But Donewald was unable to get the Broncos back to the NCAA again, and was fired in 2000.

In 1978, Donewald accepted the head coach position at Brown University but backed out minutes before a press conference at the University to announce the hiring. Rumor is that Donewald told the Brown athletic director he would walk to the airport after backing out.

Donewald today lives with his wife of over 40 years in their Kalamazoo home, where he does consulting work for several college and pro teams.  He also works occasionally as a color analyst.  His son, Bob Donewald, Jr., is currently the head coach of the Iowa Wolves.

Head coaching record

References

1942 births
Living people
American men's basketball coaches
American men's basketball players
Basketball coaches from Michigan
Basketball players from Michigan
College men's basketball head coaches in the United States
Hanover Panthers men's basketball players
Illinois State Redbirds men's basketball coaches
Indiana Hoosiers men's basketball coaches
Sportspeople from Kalamazoo, Michigan
Western Michigan Broncos men's basketball coaches